The Black Devil is a 1957 Italian adventure film written and directed by Sergio Grieco.

Plot 
In 1525 the nobleman Lorenzo di Roccabruna tries to establish a union between Italians and Spaniards through the marriage of his niece Isabella of Spain with King Ferdinand of Aragon. Nevertheless, the people of Roquebrune disagree and attack the Spaniards under the command of a mysterious masked man known as "The Black Devil".

Cast 
Gérard Landry: Osvaldo de' Marzi
Milly Vitale: Isabella
Nadia Gray: Duchess Lucrezia
Maurizio Arena: Ruggero
Leonora Ruffo: Stella
Andrea Aureli: Lorenzo di Roccabruna
Nino Crisman: Don Pedro

References

External links

1957 films
Italian historical adventure films
Films directed by Sergio Grieco
Films set in the 1520s
1950s historical adventure films
1950s Italian films